In music theory, the dominant seventh flat five chord is a seventh chord composed of a root note, together with a major third, a diminished fifth, and a minor seventh above the root (1, 3, 5 and 7). For example, the dominant seventh flat five chord built on C, commonly written as C75, is composed of the pitches C–E–G–B: 

 

It can be represented by the integer notation {0, 4, 6, 10}. 

This chord is enharmonically equivalent to its own second inversion. That is, it has the same notes as the dominant seventh flat five chord a tritone away (although they may be spelled differently), so for instance, F75 and C75 are enharmonically equivalent. Because of this property, it readily functions as a pivot chord. It is also frequently encountered in tritone substitutions.  In this sense, there are only six "unique" dominant seventh flat five chords.

In diatonic harmony, the dominant seventh flat five chord does not naturally occur on any scale degree (as does, for example, the dominant seventh chord on the fifth scale degree of the major scale e.g. C7 in F major). In classical harmony, the chord is rarely seen spelled as a seventh chord and is instead most commonly found as the enharmonically equivalent French sixth chord. 

In jazz harmony, the dominant seventh flat five may be considered an altered chord, created by lowering the fifth of a dominant seventh chord, and may use the whole-tone scale, as may the augmented minor seventh chord, or the Lydian 7 mode, as well as most of the modes of the Neapolitan major scale, such as the major Locrian scale, the leading whole-tone scale, and the Lydian minor scale.

Dominant seventh flat five chord table
{| class="wikitable"
!Chord
!Root
!Major third
!Diminished fifth
!Minor seventh
|-
!C75
|C
|E
|G
|B
|-
!C75
|C
|E (F)
|G
|B
|-
!D75
|D
|F
|A (G)
|C (B)
|-
!D75
|D
|F
|A
|C
|-
!D75
|D
|F (G)
|A
|C
|-
!E75
|E
|G
|B (A)
|D
|-
!E75
|E
|G
|B
|D
|-
!F75
|F
|A
|C (B)
|E
|-
!F75
|F
|A
|C
|E
|-
!G75
|G
|B
|D (C)
|F (E)
|-
!G75
|G
|B
|D
|F
|-
!G75
|G
|B (C)
|D
|F
|-
!A75
|A
|C
|E (D)
|G
|-
!A75
|A
|C
|E
|G
|-
!A75
|A
|C (D)
|E
|G
|-
!B75
|B
|D
|F (E)
|A
|-
!B75
|B
|D
|F
|A
|-
|}

Chords for guitarists

Dominant seventh flat five chords for a guitar in standard tuning. (left is the low E string, number is the fret, x means mute the string)

 A75: xx6778
 B75: x23245
 C75: x34356
 D75: xx0112
 E75: 010130
 F75: xx3445
 G75: xx5667

See also
 Altered scale
 French sixth
 Half diminished chord

References

Altered chords
Seventh chords